Eramala is a village in Kozhikode district, Kerala, India.  The village is also home to a popular annual celebration called Orkkatteri Chantha.

Demographics
 India census, Eramala had a population of 32,151 with 15,069 males and 17,082 females.

Transportation
Eramala village connects to other parts of India through Vatakara city on the west and Kuttiady town on the east.  National highway No.66 passes through Vatakara and the northern stretch connects to Mangalore, Goa and Mumbai.  The southern stretch connects to Cochin and Trivandrum.  The eastern highway going through Kuttiady connects to Mananthavady, Mysore and Bangalore. The nearest airports are at Kannur and Kozhikode.  The nearest railway station is at Vatakara.

References

Vatakara area